Sordaria is a genus of microscopic fungi. It is commonly found in the feces of herbivores. The genus has a widespread distribution, and contains 12 species.

References

Sordariales